Catocala gansan is a moth in the family Erebidae. It is found in China (Yunnan).

References

gansan
Moths described in 2013
Moths of Asia